The politics of Vermont encompass the acts of the elected legislative bodies of the US state, the actions of its governors, as overseen by the Vermont courts, and the acts of the political parties that vie for elective power within the state. The state's politics include local Democratic and Republican political parties, as well as several smaller parties.

Vermont's constitution, which was drafted in 1777 when Vermont became an independent republic, reflects the concerns of a sovereign state; it prohibited adult slavery except in certain limited circumstances and provided for universal male suffrage and public schools. These provisions were carried over to the state Constitution when Vermont joined the Union in 1791. Vermont has been a pioneer in legislation pertaining to land use, gay rights, and school funding. Between 1854 and 1962, the state always voted Republican for Governor, thereafter, the governor's office alternated between the Democratic and Republican parties. The legislature has been primarily Democratic since the mid-1980s.

In 1854, the Vermont delegation, consisting of three congressmen and two senators, vigorously, but unsuccessfully opposed the repeal of the Missouri Compromise in the U.S. Congress. The replacement act appeared to extend slavery.

From the founding of the Republican Party in the 1850s until the 1960s, only Republicans won general elections for Vermont's statewide offices. One method that made this possible was imposition of the "Mountain Rule." Under the provisions of the Mountain Rule, one U.S. Senator was a resident of the east side of the Green Mountains and one resided on the west side, and the governorship and lieutenant governorship alternated between residents of the east and west side. Nominees for Governor and Lieutenant Governor were allowed two one-year terms and, later, one two-year term. For nearly 100 years, likely Republican candidates for office in Vermont agreed to abide by the Mountain Rule in the interests of party unity. Several factors led to the eventual weakening of the Mountain Rule, including: the long time political dispute between the Proctor (conservative) and Aiken–Gibson (liberal) wings of the party; primaries rather than conventions to select nominees; the direct election of U.S. Senators; and several active third parties, including the Progressives, the Prohibition Party, and the Local Option movement. In the 1960s, the rise of the Vermont Democratic Party and the construction of Interstate 89 also contributed to the end of the Mountain Rule. Though I-89 is a north–south route, it traverses Vermont from east to west and changed the way Vermonters viewed how the state was divided.

Constitution

Vermont is one of four states that once was an independent nation, as the Republic of Vermont. The other states that used to be independent are Texas as the Republic of Texas, California as the California Republic, and Hawaii as the Kingdom and later Republic of Hawaii.

The Constitution of Vermont is organized into two sections, one declaring the rights of inhabitants and the other defining the governing power. In 21 articles, the rights of the inhabitants enumerated by the Vermont constitution address, among other things, the prohibition of slavery, compensation for use of property, freedom of worship, "free and pure" elections, freedoms regarding search and seizure, freedom of speech and press, trial by jury, the right to bear arms, and the right to assemble. In 76 sections the governing powers enumerated by the Vermont constitution address, among other things, the composition of the legislative, executive, and judicial bodies and their powers, the conduct of elections, and general administrative powers of government.

Notable constitutional provisions
The Vermont constitution and the courts support the right of a person to walk (fish and hunt) on any unposted, unfenced, land. That is, trespass must be proven by the owner; it is not automatically presumed.

Vermont is the only state in the union without a balanced budget requirement. Nevertheless, from 1991 and as of 2011, it had balanced its budget.

Legislation by statute
Vermont legislators sometimes have addressed the character of the state and the rights of Vermonters with landmark legislation, organized here according to the pertinent title in the Vermont Statutes Annotated, which is the official codification of the laws enacted by the General Assembly.

Alcoholic beverages—Title 7 
Vermont is an alcoholic beverage control state. Alcoholic beverages may be sold in local grocery stores unless the town in which the store located has voted "dry" at their town meeting. Only state-licensed establishments may sell stronger alcoholic beverages in bottles. The number of these stores is limited. Prices are set by the state. The state directly controls the licensing of establishments that sell alcoholic beverages by the drink. In 2007, through the Vermont Department of Liquor Control, the state took in more than $14 million from the sale and distribution of liquor. There are 75 State Liquor Stores and 1,350 taverns in the state.

Conservation and development—Title 10 

After passage of the billboard-regulating Highway Beautification Act of 1965, Vermont moved to ban off-site billboards in 1968. All roadside billboards were gone from Vermont by 1974. Vermont is one of four states, along with Alaska, Hawaii, and Maine, to have prohibited by law all billboards from view of highway rights-of-way, except for signs on the contiguous property of the business location.

After the legislature was redistricted under one-person, one-vote, it passed legislation to accommodate American emigrants from New York, which earlier legislatures had ignored. The new legislation was the Land Use and Development Law (Act 250) in 1970. The law, which was the first of its kind in the nation, created nine district environmental commissions consisting of private citizens, appointed by the governor, who must approve land development and subdivision plans that would have a significant impact on the state's environment and many small communities. As a result of Act 250, Vermont was the last state to get a Wal-Mart.
As a result of Act 250, there is only one trash disposal site in the state, located in Coventry near Lake Memphremagog.

Act 148 effectively requires the towns to recycle glass and plastic in 2015, and food waste by 2020. Landfills will no longer accept these wastes after those dates.

Crimes and criminal procedure—Title 13 
After executing 26 people, Vermont put its last convict to death in 1954. The first 21 were executed by hanging, the last five by the electric chair. Vermont abolished the death penalty in 1965. As of 2015, Vermont is one of eight states along with Alaska, Arizona, Arkansas, Kansas, Maine, West Virginia, and Wyoming in the Union to allow any adult to carry a concealed firearm without any sort of permit. There is no statute barring public nudity in Vermont unless it constitutes "open and gross lewdness and lascivious behavior", however local ordinances may bar disrobing in public. In 2010, the state enacted a law requiring that a DNA sample be taken from everyone arraigned on a felony, which is entered into a database controlled by the FBI. The age of consent in Vermont is 16.

Domestic relations—Title 15 

In Baker v. Vermont (1999), the Vermont Supreme Court ruled that, under the Constitution of Vermont, the state must either allow same-sex marriage or provide a separate but equal institution for same-sex couples. The state legislature chose the second option by creating the institution of civil union. The 2000 bill was passed by the legislature and signed into law by Governor Howard Dean. It granted same-sex couples nearly all the rights and privileges of marriage. Passage of this law engendered a backlash against this and other perceived changes to Vermont culture, which became manifest in the Take Back Vermont movement in the same year.

In 2009 however, the state legislature passed a same-sex marriage bill that was vetoed by Governor Jim Douglas. The legislature overrode the veto, making Vermont the first state to recognize same-sex marriage as the result of a bill passed in the legislature and not due to a judicial ruling.

Education—Title 16 
Vermont's Act 60, known as "The Equal Educational Opportunity Act", was a law enacted in June 1997 by the Vermont legislature to achieve a fair balance of educational spending across school districts, independent of the degree of prosperity within each district. The law was in response to a Vermont Supreme Court decision in the Brigham vs. State of Vermont case, wherein the court ruled that Vermont's then existing educational funding system was unconstitutional, because it allowed students in towns with higher total property values to receive a higher level of education funding per pupil than students in towns with lower property values. For most towns the "equalized yield" for any local taxes above the statewide level decreased property taxes and increased the funds available for their schools, however, certain ski towns that had been spending much more per pupil than most districts, experienced the opposite result. Among them was the town of Killington, which voted 3:1 to secede from Vermont and join New Hampshire due to what the locals say is an unfair tax burden. "Gold Towns", such as Killington, generally were satisfied with the resolution in 2003 contained in Act 68, which continued "equalized yield", but gave those towns latitude to spend more at home.

Elections—Title 17 
The state is one of three  in the nation that does not require political candidates to disclose personal financial information. Vermont is one of two states who allow prison inmates to vote, the other being Maine.

Health—Title 18 
As a result of statutory benefits such as Dr. Dynasaur, Vermont, with 9.5% of the population with no health insurance, has the second best coverage in the country, as of 2004.

In 2007, the governor signed the "Prescription Confidentiality Law", required that records containing a doctor's prescribing practices not be sold or used for marketing purposes unless the doctor consented. This statute was struck down in 2011 by the U.S. Supreme Court in Sorrell v. IMS Health, Inc. as a violation of the First Amendment.

In 2009, Vermont passed the strictest law in the nation controlling the marketing of pharmaceutical drugs to doctors, hospitals and other health providers. In the same year, the state outlawed smoking at workplaces.

In May 2013, Vermont passed Act 39 ( the Patient Choice and Control at End of Life Act), becoming the first state to allow assisted suicide for terminally ill patients under certain conditions. On June 6, 2013, Vermont became the 17th state to decriminalize marijuana. The statute makes possession of less than an ounce of the drug punishable by a small fine rather than arrest and possible jail time.

By 2018, the state had set a maximum level, for PFAs, of 20 parts per trillion in drinking water total for all of the PFA chemicals. In 2019, it had the strictest standard in the nation for PFOAs. The state presumes that groundwater is a state resource, and that all water found anywhere on the surface is potable (drinkable). Leachate into the Clyde River from the single dump in Vermont, in Coventry, was reported "safe" by government authorities in 2018.

Fire Districts - Title 20
As of 2017, the establishment of fire districts included fire departments. However they were most often used to establish water systems. They may also be used to establish community sewer systems, sidewalks, and street lighting.

Motor Vehicles—Title 23 
In Vermont a driver may regard double yellow lines as "advisory," meaning that they merely are a warning not to cross over them. A motorist will not be ticketed for that as an offense by itself.

Municipal and County Government—Title 24 
Having tried to discourage suburban sprawl, the legislatures of 1998 and 2002 moved to encourage downtowns. In 2008, there were 23 designated downtowns and 78 village centers.

The state has an "open meeting" law. This requires special attention when a quorum of an elected government group is meeting anyplace, including socially.

Public Records Act
The Vermont Public Records Law states that “any agency, board, department, commission, committee, branch, instrumentality, or authority of the state or any agency, board, committee, department, branch, instrumentality, commission, or authority of any political subdivision of the state" is obligated to provide access to public records for inspection and copying unless the records are exempt by law from public access. Exemptions might include records that have been determined to be confidential by law, records that by law may only be disclosed to certain people, etc. Public records are defined as "any written or recorded information, regardless of physical form or characteristics, which is produced or acquired in the course of public agency business".

A line from the law that was especially stood out was that “[o]fficers of government are trustees and servants of the people and it is in the public interest to enable any person to review and criticize their decisions even though such examination may cause inconvenience or embarrassment”. It goes on to say that everyone has a right to privacy, especially in economic and personal pursuits, and it should be kept private unless there is a specific need of the record to scrutinize the decisions of a government official.

One can go to any public agency and inspect or make copies of any public record (beyond exemptions) during normal business hours of that agency. If access is denied by the agency, one can appeal. In that case, the agency head must respond within 5 business days to the appeal and must “include the asserted statutory basis for denial and a brief statement of the reasons and supporting facts for denial”. If the denial is reversed, the agency must make the records available to the person requesting immediately.

The format for a records request can vary in VT. (“Unless otherwise allowed by law, agencies must accept records requests in any manner or format presented by a member of the public”.) The exceptions to this are if the request will take more than 30 minutes to fulfill or the requester is asking for it to be transmitted in a nontraditional format. In those cases, the agency might ask for the request in writing. Costs associated with the requests might be costs of copying, costs of mailing the request, or, if the request will take longer than 30 minutes to complete, the agency might ask for the cost of staff time. (The Secretary of State and Secretary of Administration will be the ones to determine the actual cost of staff time in that instance.) Agencies will provide an estimate of costs to requester.

Federal elections

|}
Historically, Vermont was considered one of the most reliably Republican states in the country in terms of national elections. From 1856 to 1988, Vermont voted Democratic only once, in Lyndon B. Johnson's landslide victory of 1964 against Barry M. Goldwater. It was also one of only two states—the other being Maine—where Franklin D. Roosevelt was completely shut out in all four of his presidential bids. In the late 19th and early 20th centuries, Republican presidential candidates frequently won the state with over 70 percent of the vote.

In the 1980s and 1990s many people moved in from out of state. Much of this immigration included the arrival of more liberal political influences of the urban areas of New York and the rest of New England in Vermont. The brand of Republicanism in Vermont has historically been a moderate one, and combined with the newcomers from out of state, this made Vermont friendlier to Democrats as the national GOP moved to the right. As evidence of this, in 1990 Bernie Sanders, a self-described democratic socialist, was elected to Vermont's lone seat in the House as an independent.  Sanders became the state's junior Senator in 2007. However, for his entire career in the House and Senate, Sanders has caucused with the Democrats and is counted as a Democrat for the purposes of committee assignments and voting for party leadership.

After narrowly supporting George H. W. Bush in 1988, it gave Democrat Bill Clinton a 16-point margin in 1992—the first time the state had gone Democratic since 1964. Vermont has voted Democratic in every presidential election since.

Since 2004, Vermont has been one of the Democrats' most loyal states.  It gave John Kerry his fourth-largest margin of victory in the presidential campaign against George W. Bush; he won the state's popular vote by 20 percentage points, taking almost 59 percent of the vote. (Kerry, from neighboring Massachusetts, also became the first Northern Democrat ever to carry Vermont; Johnson was from Texas, Clinton from Arkansas and Al Gore, triumphant in the Green Mountain State in 2000, from Tennessee.) Essex County in the state's northeastern section was the only county to vote for Bush in both of his nationwide victories in 2000 and 2004. Vermont is the only state that did not receive a visit from George W. Bush during his tenure as President of the United States.  Indeed, George W. Bush is the first Republican to win the White House without carrying Vermont; he lost it in 2004 as well. In 2008, Vermont gave Barack Obama his third-largest margin of victory (37 percentage points) and third-largest vote share in the nation by his winning the state 68% to 31%. Only Obama's birth state of Hawaii and Washington, D.C. were stronger Democratic victories. The same held true in 2012, when Obama carried Vermont 67% to 31%.

In 2016, Bernie Sanders (a former candidate for the Democratic nomination) received 5.68% of the vote as a write-in candidate, more than Gary Johnson's 3.14% and Jill Stein's 2.11% combined. Sanders received the highest write-in draft campaign percentage for a statewide presidential candidate in history. Along with that, with 30.27% of the vote, Donald Trump's performance is the weakest showing for a Republican in Vermont, setting a record low for the party since George H. W. Bush lost the state in 1992 with 30.4% of the vote. In the 2020, Vermont was the most Democratic state in the nation for the first time in the state's history. 

Vermont's two Senators are Democrat Peter Welch and Independent Bernie Sanders. The state is represented by an at-large member of the House, Democrat Becca Balint.

State Government
In 1985, the Vermont legislature passed and in 1986 voters narrowly defeated an equal rights amendment to the Vermont constitution. However, in 2007 Governor Jim Douglas signed a landmark civil rights bill banning discrimination on the basis of gender identity by employers, financial institutions, housing, public accommodations, and other contexts, after it had passed both chambers of the legislature by a veto-proof majority. Douglas previously had vetoed a similar bill in 2006.

Upon his entry into office with the death of his predecessor, Republican Richard A. Snelling in 1991, Governor Howard Dean faced a national economic recession and a $60 million state budget deficit. Facing some opposition in his own Democratic Party, he advocated for and received from the legislature a balanced budget. This set a precedent of fiscal restraint, which has continued in Vermont through 2011. In 1999, five moderate Democratic legislators, called "Blue Dogs", joined with Republicans to pass Democratic, but fiscally conservative, governor Howard Dean's plans for an income tax cut.

In 2009 Governor Douglas vetoed a bill allowing marriage for same sex couples in Vermont. The Vermont House and Senate overrode the veto the next day. Also 2009, Governor Douglas vetoed a budget bill—a first in Vermont history. The Democratically controlled legislature returned to special session and overturned the veto.

Currently, Democrats hold supermajorities in both chambers of the Vermont General Assembly, and have controlled both chambers since 2005. The current governor is a moderate Republican Phil Scott, who was re-elected in 2022 with 70% of the vote, despite the state's strong Democratic lean.

World War II
On September 16, 1941, prior to the United States of America joining World War II, the state declared that the nation was in an armed conflict, enabling servicemen to receive state wartime bonuses. This resulted in national headlines that Vermont had declared war on Germany.

Court rulings
By a court decision from 1903, State vs Rosenthal, people have the right to carry firearms without a permit.

The Vermont Attorney General attempts to uphold bills that have passed into law, which included the 2007 "Prescription Confidentiality Law." Attempting to uphold that state statute, which was struck down by the U.S. Supreme Court in Sorrell v. IMS Health, Inc., cost the state $4,003,000.

In Randall v. Sorrell, the Supreme Court overturned the strictest campaign financing statute in the country. The state was obligated to pay the plaintiffs $1,395,000.

In 2012, the federal district court struck down the state's law giving it a say on whether Vermont Yankee nuclear plant stays open or not. The state appealed. In August 2013 Entergy announced the decommissioning of the plant in the fourth quarter of 2014. It cited economic factors, notably the low cost of electricity caused by cheap natural gas.

Political parties 
Vermont's political system has branches of the major national parties in the United States, as well as two local leftist parties.

Republican Party

Democratic Party

Progressive Party

Liberty Union

See also
 Electoral reform in Vermont
 Government of Vermont
 Elections in Vermont
 List of politics by U.S. state

Footnotes

External links
 
 Vermont Statutes and Constitution on line
 Congressional Papers collection, Center for Digital Initiatives, University of Vermont Library